Plant species in the genus Allium known as wild garlic include the following:

Allium canadense, wild onion
Allium carinatum, keeled garlic
Allium drummondii, Drummond's onion
Allium ochotense, Siberian onion
Allium oleraceum, field garlic
Allium paradoxum, few-flowered garlic or few-flowered leek
Allium triquetrum, three-cornered leek
Allium ursinum, ramsons, native to British and European woodlands
Allium vineale, crow garlic
Allium macrostemon (野蒜, ノビル), native to Japanese and East asian woodlands

Wild garlic is also a common name for plants in the genus Tulbaghia.

See also

Wild onion
Alliaria petiolata

Allium